The Washington County Courthouse and Jail in West Bend, Wisconsin is the historic former courthouse of Washington County, Wisconsin. It now holds the Tower Heritage Center, a museum and research center operated by the Washington County Historical Society. The building was listed on the National Register of Historic Places in 1982. 

It is a 3.5-story building with an 8-story central tower designed by Edward V. Koch in Richardsonian Romanesque style and built 1889–90, with 1886 jail. It served as courthouse until 1962.

References

External links
 

Courthouses in Wisconsin
Jails in Wisconsin
National Register of Historic Places in Washington County, Wisconsin
Queen Anne architecture in Wisconsin
Romanesque Revival architecture in Wisconsin
Government buildings completed in 1886